Radermachera sinica, also called china doll, serpent tree or emerald tree, is an evergreen tree in the family Bignoniaceae, native to the subtropical mountain regions of southern China and Taiwan.

In recent years, this plant has become popular as a houseplant for its attractive and glossy, feathery leaves. The specific name sinica means "from China".

Description
R. sinica can reach heights of up to 30 m tall and a trunk diameter of 1 m. The leaves are bipinnate, 20 to 70 cm long and 15 to 25 cm broad, divided into numerous small glossy green leaflets 2 to 4 cm long. The flowers are white, trumpet-like, about 7 cm long, and resembling a large Bignonia or Catalpa flower in shape.  The flowers are night-blooming and only last for one night, wilting in the morning sun.  The blooms appear spring to early summer, and are highly fragrant.

Cultivation

Radermachera sinica is often sold as a small houseplant, grown for its attractive glossy leaves; it does not normally flower indoors. It requires plenty of light and moisture in order to thrive. As with most houseplants, wilted leaves indicate either lack of water or overwatering. Recent dwarf variations have been released, often referred to as the Asian Bell Tree. The foliage is highly attractive and is glossy, dark green, and lacy. it consistently grows to a maximum of 3 meters and so makes a very popular indoor or patio plant, requiring a position with indirect sunlight. It can be grown outdoors in tropical to subtropical regions, and also areas with a Mediterranean climate. It should be planted in rich, well-drained soil in full sun to part shade and protect from drying winds and frost, which it cannot tolerate.

See also
List of Radermachera sinica diseases

References

External links
 
 

sinica
Plants described in 1905